Crewe Stadium, also known as Earle Street, was a stadium in Crewe, Cheshire, England. Located north of Crewe railway station, it was used for speedway and stock car racing. The track was redeveloped in 1993 and is now the site of a retail park.

Track

Stock car racing 
The track was used for BriSCA F1 Stock Cars from 1982, promoted by a local businessman, Jim Barrie, BriSCA Formula 2 Stock Cars also raced from 1981. The F2 World Final was held in 1993, the biggest Oval Track the F2's raced on. It also hosted V8 Hotstox, and various other forms of oval motor sport including National Hot Rods, Banger racing, Ministox and Rebels. The very last meeting held was on 11 December 1993.

Speedway
The Crewe Kings ran at Earle Street from 1969 until 1975 when it closed down due to financial difficulties.

References

External links
The Official BriSCA F1 website
The Official BriSCA F2 website
Crewe - Defunct Speedway
Crewe Stadium Nostalgia

Sports venues in Cheshire
Defunct speedway venues in England
Buildings and structures in Crewe
Stock car racing venues